Starrabba is an Italian surname. Notable people with the surname include:

 Antonio Starabba, Marchese di Rudinì (1839–1908), Italian politician, 18th and 21st Prime Minister of Italy
 Gaetano Starrabba (born 1932), Italian racing driver

Italian-language surnames